The 1975 Summer Universiade, also known as the VIII Summer Universiade, took place in Rome, Italy. The 1975 Universiade only featured athletics, other disciplines having been cancelled, as the original host Yugoslavia was unable to hold the event. It was therefore referred to as the World University Championships in athletics.

Sports

Medal table

References

 
1975
U
U
U
Multi-sport events in Italy
Sports competitions in Rome
1970s in Rome
September 1975 sports events in Europe